"It's the Most Wonderful Time of the Year" is a popular Christmas song written in 1963 by Edward Pola and George Wyle. It was recorded and released that year by pop singer Andy Williams for his first Christmas album, The Andy Williams Christmas Album. However, the song was not released as a promotional single by Williams' record label (Columbia Records) that year, as they instead opted to promote his cover of "White Christmas" as the official promo single from the album. The song peaked at No. 21 on the UK Singles Chart in 2007 and reached into the Top 10 consistently in the 2000s, peaking at No. 5 in 2020 on the Billboard Hot 100 singles chart in the USA.

History

Song content

The song is a celebration and description of activities associated with the Christmas season, focusing primarily on get-togethers between friends and families. Among the activities included in the song is the telling of "scary ghost stories," a Victorian Christmas tradition that has mostly fallen into disuse, but survives in the seasonal popularity of numerous adaptations of Charles Dickens' A Christmas Carol. Other activities mentioned include hosting parties, spontaneous visits from friends, universal social gaiety, spending time with loved ones, sledding for children, roasting marshmallows, sharing stories about previous Christmases, and singing Christmas carols in winter weather.

In a 2005 interview, Williams discusses how The Andy Williams Show figured into his recording of the song, first introduced in the 1962 Christmas episode: George Wyle, who is a vocal director, who wrote all of the choir stuff and all of the duets and trios and things that I did with all the guests, he wrote a song just for the show – I think the second Christmas show we did – called 'Most Wonderful Time of the Year'. So I did that, you know, every Christmas, and then other people started doing it. And then suddenly it's become – not suddenly but over 30 years – it's become a big standard. I think it's one of the top 10 Christmas songs of all time now.

Although Williams recorded multiple other versions throughout his life, the original 1963 version remains the most popular and well-known.

The song was selected as the theme song for Christmas Seals in 1968, 1976, 2009 and 2012.

Other notable versions
 1986: Johnny Mathis, for his album Christmas Eve with Johnny Mathis. This recording later made both the Billboard Holiday 100 and Holiday Airplay charts during the 2000s and 2010s.
 1992: Amy Grant for her album, Home for Christmas.
 1997: Peabo Bryson for his album, Peace on Earth.
 1999: Garth Brooks, for his album Garth Brooks and the Magic of Christmas. Brooks also became the first artist to chart a version of the song in North America, as his remake peaked at No. 56 on the Billboard Hot Country Singles & Tracks chart on the week ending January 8, 2000.
 2003/2004: Andy Williams, in a shorter, more upbeat version for the 2004 film Surviving Christmas.
 2008: Harry Connick Jr., for his album What a Night! A Christmas Album. This recording peaked at No. 9 on the Billboard Adult Contemporary chart on the week ending December 20, 2008.
 2008: BarlowGirl, for their album, Home for Christmas. This recording peaked at No. 21 on the Billboard Hot Christian Songs chart and at No. 25 on the Billboard Christian AC Songs charts (both on the week ending January 3, 2009).
 2015: Kylie Minogue for her album, Kylie Christmas.
 2020: Stevie Mackey, Jennifer Lopez and The Eleven for Mackey's album, The Most Wonderful Time. This recording peaked at No. 24 on the Billboard Adult Contemporary chart on the week ending December 19, 2021.

Use in advertising and parodies
Since 1995, the song was used humorously in the Staples office supply retail chain's annual back to school advertising campaign. In the commercials, the parents joyously shop for school supplies to this song in anticipation of the upcoming school year while their children sullenly follow.

The UK travel retailer On the Beach has used the song in its advertising since 2021.

Chart performance
In the issue of Billboard magazine dated November 28, 2009, the list of the "Top 10 Holiday Songs (Since 2001)" places the Williams recording of "It's the Most Wonderful Time of the Year" at number five. 2001 also marked the first year in which the American Society of Composers, Authors and Publishers (ASCAP) started compiling data regarding the radio airplay of holiday songs, and although the Williams classic started out at number 25 of twenty-five songs that were ranked that year, it gained steam over the next ten years, reaching number 18 in 2002, number 13 in 2003, and eventually getting to number four in 2010.

Because of its use in an advertisement for Marks & Spencer, a CD single of the Williams recording was released in the UK in 2007 and gave the song its first of many annual appearances on the UK singles chart. In December 2011, Billboard returned to the practice of publishing a seasonal Christmas singles chart, and the Williams song debuted at number eight on the newly christened Holiday 100, where it has reappeared every year since. In December 2016, Williams' original version began a series of annual chart runs on the Billboard Hot 100, reaching the top 10 for the first time in December 2018. On the Hot 100 chart from the 2020 holiday season dated January 2, 2021, it reached a new all-time peak of No. 5.

Weekly charts
Andy Williams version

Certifications and sales

Andy Williams version

References

1963 singles
1963 songs
American Christmas songs
Amy Grant songs
Andy Williams songs
Columbia Records singles
Johnny Mathis songs
Peabo Bryson songs
Songs with lyrics by Edward Pola
Songs with music by George Wyle